Antonio Veić and Franko Škugor were the defending champions and successfully defended their title by defeating Radu Albot and Artem Sitak in the final, 6–4, 7–6(7–3).

Seeds

Draw

Draw

References
 Main Draw

BRD Arad Challengerandnbsp;- Doubles
2014 Doubles